Ponteix is a town in southwestern Saskatchewan, Canada, 86 km (53 mi) southeast of Swift Current. It is located on Highway 628 just north of Highway 13.

History

In 1908, Father Albert-Marie Royer from the Auvergne region in France established a parish and hamlet called Notre-Dame d’Auvergne north of Notukeu Creek. Five years later, the townsite was moved south of the creek when the Canadian Pacific Railway laid track south of the creek. After the move, the community was renamed Ponteix after Father Royer's former parish in France (Le Ponteix, commune of Aydat).

Demographics 

According to the 2011 federal census, 175 of Ponteix's residents spoke both official languages (English and French).

Attractions
 Plesiosaur Statue: Near Ponteix was the site of a plesiosaur find in the early 1990s. In 1995 community members and students of Ponteix school contributed small articles to this plesiosaur statue before it was filled with cement and painted by the townspeople in a ceremony commemorating the discovery of the original plesiosaur's bones. 
 Notukeu Heritage Museum located in Ponteix features prehistoric artifacts. 
 Notre Dame D'Auvergne Catholic Church, a brick and concrete structure in Ponteix built in 1929, features twin steeples and houses a large wood carving of the Pieta. The Pieta statue came to Canada in 1909 and was saved when the 1916 church was destroyed by fire in 1923. A description of the oak statue in 1954 by Abbot Jerome Webber of St. Peter's Abbey claims it was made in France over four hundred years ago, was saved by peasants during the French Revolution and was once covered in pure gold.

Notable residents
Mark Lamb, a former professional hockey player and now assistant coach for the Dallas Stars, was born in Ponteix.

See also 

 List of communities in Saskatchewan
 List of towns in Saskatchewan

References

Towns in Saskatchewan
Division No. 3, Saskatchewan